XHPTEA-FM is a radio station on 94.9 FM in Soteapan, Veracruz, with studios in Acayucan. It is owned by Arturo Ordaz Gallegos and is known as Istmo 94.9 with a contemporary hit radio format.

History
XHPTEA was awarded in the IFT-4 radio auction of 2017 on a rebound after the initial winning bidder, Tecnoradio, was disqualified from the auction. The winning bid by Arturo Ordaz Gallegos was 1.52 million pesos.

References

External links

Radio stations in Veracruz
Radio stations established in 2020
2020 establishments in Mexico